Mulund (Pronunciation: [muluɳɖ]) is a suburb in the north-east of Mumbai, Maharashtra, India. It is also a railway station on the Central Railway line of the Mumbai Suburban Railway. It is also the first railway station of Mumbai Suburban district on the central railway line. After this, Thane railway station comes under Thane district. It is nestled alongside the foothills of the Sanjay Gandhi National Park with easy access to the Eastern Express Highway and Navi Mumbai through the Mulund-Airoli Bridge. Mulund marks the end of Mumbai city.

History
Mulund's history is said to date back to the time of the Mauryan Empire. Referred to at that time as Muchalind, its name changed to Mul-Kund which then modified to its present name. At one point in time, the name Manglapuri was also associated with it. It is said to be the earliest planned neighborhood of Mumbai city. In 1922, a zamindar, Jhaverbhai, who owned Jhaverbhai Narottamdas & Company, gave architects Crown & Carter the permission to design Mulund. Crown and Carter used a gridiron plan - one where streets are at right angles to each other - which extends from present day Mulund railway station to Panch Rasta road Junction in Mulund (West).

Demographics 
It is a part of Mumbai's T-ward. Mulund has around 73,540 households. Mulund is quite diversified in terms of culture. The western part has a large Gujarati population, particularly from station side till Panch rasta and the Jain community near the Jain temple in Sarvodaya Nagar. Whilst the Eastern part is dominated by Marathi speaking population, it also has pockets of Gujarati, Sindhi, and Tamil speaking population. Local Koli/Agri communities in Gavanpada, Nanepada, Navghar pada are integral part of the suburb. Mulund MHADA colony is another zone which was developed post 1995. Dense crowd of Marathi, Goan and Malayali christians reside closer to the St. Pius Church, South Indian population reside closer to the Murugan temple and Ayyappan temple. Marathi population is also dominant in Mulund west near Tambe nagar, dumping road, kadam pada, nahur road, cement company, near mehul talkies. In recent years, due to newer building constructions and the average person's affordability to transportation and personal vehicles, the cultural shifts have expanded across the city, rather than being concentrated to certain localities.

Economy
Mulund is home to a mix of a large number of industrial factories located along present day L.B.S. road. Some of which are pharmaceutical companies such as - Hoechst, Wellcome, Glaxo and Johnson & Johnson. Several engineering companies were also located in the, but eventually shifted out of Mulund. Their locations have been converted to shopping malls and residential apartment complexes altering the landscape and skyline. Johnson and Johnson factory still remains one of the avant garde modern architectural landmarks of Mulund. Other pharmaceutical companies have shut shop and moved on to different locations.

Entertainment 

Mulund has a wide array of entertainment spots. From theatres (Kalidas Hall) to parks (Johnson & Johnson park and Lala Tuddshiram  Garden (opp.Bus Depot) to shopping malls (R-mall and Nirmal Lifestyle) and  a variety of cafés and restaurants.

Theatres and Culture 
Mulund's Mahakavi Kalidas Natyamandir (named after classical Sanskrit Poet Kalidasa) is said to be one of Mumbai's theatre auditoriums. In its main hall, it can seat up to 1540 guests.  Established in 1988, Kalidas Hall is one of the oldest theatres in Mumbai, yet it still remains very popular among Mulund residents. Despite its putting up a huge array of shows - from plays to dances and classical music concerts- the hall is maintained in good condition.
Several cinema halls such as R Mall based multiplex, PVR Mulund & NY cinemas (old JaiGanesh cinema) a cozy multi screen new cinema hall in Mulund East cater to cosmopolitan population.

Parks and Greenery 
Mulund has a total of 8 parks and gardens, thus there is always one near any locality in the suburb. The most of popular of the parks are Chintamani Dwarkanath Deshmukh Gardens and the Johnson & Johnson Park. Mulund also has hills which are frequently visited by nature enthusiast for trekking. Yogi Hills, connects Mulund to Borivali National Park and it is explored by many people all year around.

Mulund boasts a large sports arena complex at Sonar Bangla Garden, run by the BMC (https://en.wikipedia.org/wiki/Brihanmumbai_Municipal_Corporation). This arena boasts a multicenter complex consisting of a children's playground, marriage halls, swimming pool complex, walking track, temple and various courts (tennis, cricket) etc., This complex keeps the health conscious and the sports enthusiasts busy with the various activities it offers for old and young alike (yoga classes, religious discourses). For the aged, it offers comfortable seating to enjoy a conversation with their peers.

Shopping 

Mulund has many shopping malls that host a huge variety of brands and wholesale stores. R-mall is one of Mulund's most popular malls. Mulund also provides a lot of choices with its street shopping. It also hosts a large amount of boutiques.

Transportation 

Mulund is well connected to other suburbs and other cities as well by adequate network of trains, BEST buses and roads including a national highway.

Mulund Station falls on the central line of Mumbai railway. It is a stop for slow local trains as well as semi-fast local trains on the central line of the Mumbai suburban network. The Mulund railway station said to be a clean station. It won a Cleanliness Award, out of the total 42 stations on the Central Railway Line. Under construction, Mumbai Metro Line 4 (WADALA - KASARVADAVALI), will be passing through Mulund's L.B.S. Road.

Educational institutions
Notable educational institutions in Mulund include:
 dayanand vedik vidyalaya and collage
 Friends Academy
 H.K. Gidwani Semi Govt. High School and College
 I.E.S Secondary School, Mulund
 Mulund College of Commerce
 Navbharat Nutan Vidyalaya 
 NES international school
 Sau Lakshmibai English Medium School
 Sharon English High School
 St George High School
 St. Mary's Convent High School
 St. Pius X High School
 Vidya Prasarak Mandal RZ Shah College of Arts Science and Commerce
 Vani Vidyalaya
 V. G. Vaze College of Arts, Science and Commerce
 Wamanrao Muranjan High School

Notable Residents
 Yukta Mookhey, Miss World 1999
 Ashwiny Iyer Tiwari, Indian filmmaker and writer
 Ajinkya Rahane, Indian International Cricketer
 Ashok Kumar (Tamil actor), Indian actor
 Nandesh Umap (Singer and Lokshahir)

References

About Mulund West:
SB Road is a residential colony, and commercial hub near Mulund West Mumbai and its PIN Code is 400080.

 
Suburbs of Mumbai